Fred Edenhauser (born 17 March 1966) is an Austrian taekwondo practitioner. He competed in the men's featherweight at the 1988 Summer Olympics.

References

External links
 
 

1966 births
Living people
Place of birth unknown
Austrian male taekwondo practitioners
Olympic taekwondo practitioners of Austria
Taekwondo practitioners at the 1988 Summer Olympics